"What a Bitch Is Love" is a song recorded by American-Australian singer Marcia Hines. The song was written by Barry Blue, Paul Greedus and produced by David Mackay and released in October 1981 as the second single from Hines' fifth studio album, Take It from the Boys (1981).

Track listing
Australian 7" single (NiTE 002) / Dutch 7" Single (FR 12019)
 "What a Bitch Is Love" (Barry Blue, Paul Greedus) – 3:29
 "It Don't Take Much" (Douglas Foxworthy, Glen Ballard, Kerry Chater) – 3:31

Charts

Weekly charts

References

Marcia Hines songs
1981 songs
1981 singles
Songs written by Barry Blue